Tujunga Wash is a  stream in Los Angeles County, California. It is called a wash because it is usually dry, especially the lower reaches, only carrying significant flows during and after storms, which usually only occur between November and April. The name of the wash derives from a Tongva village name.

About
The name Tujunga or Tuxunga means "old woman's place" in both Fernandeño and Tongva, where Tuxu means "old woman". The term is thought to relate to an ethnohistoric narrative, known as Khra'wiyawi, collected by Carobeth Laird from Juan and Juana Menendez at the Leonis Adobe in 1916. In the narrative, the wife of Khra'wiyawi (the chief of the region) is stricken with grief over the untimely loss of her daughter. In her sadness, she retreats to the mountains and turns to stone. It is thought this event became the basis for the village name. In fact, there is a large rock in Little Tujunga Canyon which looks like an old woman in a sitting position. However, there was also a Fernandeño village in the vicinity of Big Tujunga Canyon called Muxúnga, which means "place of shooting" in the Fernandeño dialect of the Tongva language. The name comes from the verb muxú, which means "shoot him."

Tujunga Wash consists of two forks, both beginning in the San Gabriel Mountains. The upper portion of Big Tujunga Wash is called Tujunga Creek, or Big Tujunga Creek. It travels roughly east to west, and several tributaries from the north and south join it as it flows to Big Tujunga Reservoir, formed by Big Tujunga Dam. Below the dam, the stream is called Big Tujunga Wash. It continues its westward flow, enters San Fernando Valley and is met by Little Tujunga Wash a mile before reaching Hansen Reservoir, which is formed by Hansen Dam. Little Tujunga Wash comes from the north, draining the portion of the San Gabriel Mountains immediately north of Hansen Reservoir. Downstream of the dam, Tujunga Wash flows roughly south and is met halfway to its confluence with the Los Angeles River by Pacoima Wash, which drains the other side of the mountains that Little Tujunga Wash drains. Finally, Tujunga Wash meets the Los Angeles River near Studio City, California.

Big Tujunga Dam was built by Los Angeles County and completed in 1931. Big Tujunga Reservoir can hold  of water. In the Los Angeles Flood of 1938 it was tested. The dam underwent a seismic retrofit, completed in July 2011, which included doubling the thickness of the gravity arch dam. Hansen Dam was built by the United States Army Corps of Engineers and completed in 1940. Hansen Reservoir can hold  of water. Their primary purposes are flood control, although they also provide some groundwater recharge. Water cannot percolate in the lower portion of the watershed because it is so urbanized that there is little bare ground and streambeds have been transformed into concrete channels, and the water flows too fast in the upper reaches of the watershed to sink into the ground very much. As a result, the majority of the water is discharged into the ocean.

In 1969, there was a flood in the Tujunga Wash.

Crossings
From north to south (with year built in parentheses):

Hansen Dam (1940)
Service bridge
Glenoaks Boulevard (1953)
Railroad
San Fernando Road (1935)
Laurel Canyon Boulevard (1952)
Interstate 5 & California 170 (1963)
Arleta Avenue (1968)
Roscoe Boulevard (1956)
Cantara Street (1952)
Saticoy Street (1952)
Railroad: Union Pacific Coast Line
Sherman Way (1952)
Vanowen Street & Fulton Avenue (1951)

Ethel Avenue
Victory Boulevard (1952)
Oxnard Street (1952)
Burbank Boulevard & Coldwater Canyon Avenue (1951)
Chandler Boulevard North (1951)
Metro G Line
Chandler Boulevard South (1957)
Magnolia Boulevard (1950)
Riverside Drive & Whitsett Avenue (1950)
U.S. Route 101 - Ventura Freeway (1959)
Laurel Canyon Boulevard (1950)
Moorpark Street (1951)
Merges with Los Angeles River

See also
Tujunga Wash Greenway and Bike Path
Great Wall of Los Angeles

References

Rivers of Los Angeles County, California
Tributaries of the Los Angeles River
Geography of the San Fernando Valley
Washes of California
San Gabriel Mountains
Studio City, Los Angeles
Sun Valley, Los Angeles
Van Nuys, Los Angeles
Rivers of Southern California

External links 

Historical Marker Database website, Tujunga Wash